M26, M-26, or M.26 may refer to:

 M-26 (aero-engine) a soviet 1930s aero-engine for autogyros and helicopters
 M26 (apple), a Malling series apple rootstock
 M-26 artillery rocket, a short-range antipersonnel rocket
 M26 grenade, a United States military hand grenade
 M-26 (Michigan highway), a state highway in Michigan in the United States
 M26 Modular Accessory Shotgun System, a lightweight shotgun system
 M26 motorway, a motorway in the United Kingdom
 M26 Pershing, an American tank used during World War II and the Korean War
 M26 Tractor, a component of the M25 Tank Transporter (nicknamed "Dragon Wagon"), a United States Army World War II tractor-trailer combination used for transporting and recovering tanks
 M26 taser, a model of the Taser from Axon.
 Macchi M.26, an Italian flying boat fighter prototype of 1924
 Miles M.26, an unbuilt Miles Aircraft project
 Messier 26 (or M26), an open star cluster in the constellation Scutum
 HMS Plover (M26), a British minelayer
 M26 (Cape Town), a Metropolitan Route in Cape Town, South Africa
 M26 (Pretoria), a Metropolitan Route in Pretoria, South Africa
 M26 (Durban), a Metropolitan Route in Durban, South Africa
 M26 (Port Elizabeth), a Metropolitan Route in Port Elizabeth, South Africa
 Lahti-Saloranta M/26, a Finnish light machine gun